A barcode or bar code is a method of representing data in a visual, machine-readable form. Initially, barcodes represented data by varying the widths, spacings and sizes of parallel lines. These barcodes, now commonly referred to as linear or one-dimensional (1D), can be scanned by special optical scanners, called barcode readers, of which there are several types. Later, two-dimensional (2D) variants were developed, using rectangles, dots, hexagons and other patterns, called matrix codes or 2D barcodes, although they do not use bars as such. 2D barcodes can be read using purpose-built 2D optical scanners, which exist in a few different forms. 2D barcodes can also be read by a digital camera connected to a microcomputer running software that takes a photographic image of the barcode and analyzes the image to deconstruct and decode the 2D barcode. A mobile device with an inbuilt camera, such as smartphone, can function as the latter type of 2D barcode reader using specialized application software (The same sort of mobile device could also read 1D barcodes, depending on the application software).

The barcode was invented by Norman Joseph Woodland and Bernard Silver and patented in the US in 1952. The invention was based on Morse code that was extended to thin and thick bars. However, it took over twenty years before this invention became commercially successful. An early use of one type of barcode in an industrial context was sponsored by the Association of American Railroads in the late 1960s. Developed by General Telephone and Electronics (GTE) and called KarTrak ACI (Automatic Car Identification), this scheme involved placing colored stripes in various combinations on steel plates which were affixed to the sides of railroad rolling stock. Two plates were used per car, one on each side, with the arrangement of the colored stripes encoding information such as ownership, type of equipment, and identification number. The plates were read by a trackside scanner located, for instance, at the entrance to a classification yard, while the car was moving past. The project was abandoned after about ten years because the system proved unreliable after long-term use.

Barcodes became commercially successful when they were used to automate supermarket checkout systems, a task for which they have become almost universal. The Uniform Grocery Product Code Council had chosen, in 1973, the barcode design developed by George Laurer. Laurer's barcode, with vertical bars, printed better than the circular barcode developed by Woodland and Silver. Their use has spread to many other tasks that are generically referred to as automatic identification and data capture (AIDC). The first use of barcodes in supermarkets was by Sainsbury's in 1973 using a system developed by Plessey. In June 1974, Marsh supermarket in Troy, Ohio used a scanner made by Photographic Sciences Corporation to scan the Universal Product Code (UPC) barcode on a pack of Wrigley's chewing gum. QR codes, a specific type of 2D barcode, have recently become very popular due to the growth in smartphone ownership.

Other systems have made inroads in the AIDC market, but the simplicity, universality and low cost of barcodes has limited the role of these other systems, particularly before technologies such as radio-frequency identification (RFID) became available after 1995.

History

In 1948 Bernard Silver, a graduate student at Drexel Institute of Technology in Philadelphia, Pennsylvania, US overheard the president of the local food chain, Food Fair, asking one of the deans to research a system to automatically read product information during checkout. Silver told his friend Norman Joseph Woodland about the request, and they started working on a variety of systems. Their first working system used ultraviolet ink, but the ink faded too easily and was expensive.

Convinced that the system was workable with further development, Woodland left Drexel, moved into his father's apartment in Florida, and continued working on the system. His next inspiration came from Morse code, and he formed his first barcode from sand on the beach. "I just extended the dots and dashes downwards and made narrow lines and wide lines out of them." To read them, he adapted technology from optical soundtracks in movies, using a 500-watt incandescent light bulb shining through the paper onto an RCA935 photomultiplier tube (from a movie projector) on the far side. He later decided that the system would work better if it were printed as a circle instead of a line, allowing it to be scanned in any direction.

On 20 October 1949, Woodland and Silver filed a patent application for "Classifying Apparatus and Method", in which they described both the linear and bull's eye printing patterns, as well as the mechanical and electronic systems needed to read the code. The patent was issued on 7 October 1952 as US Patent 2,612,994. In 1951, Woodland moved to IBM and continually tried to interest IBM in developing the system. The company eventually commissioned a report on the idea, which concluded that it was both feasible and interesting, but that processing the resulting information would require equipment that was some time off in the future.

IBM offered to buy the patent, but the offer was not accepted. Philco purchased the patent in 1962 and then sold it to RCA sometime later.

Collins at Sylvania
During his time as an undergraduate, David Jarrett Collins worked at the Pennsylvania Railroad and became aware of the need to automatically identify railroad cars. Immediately after receiving his master's degree from MIT in 1959, he started work at GTE Sylvania and began addressing the problem. He developed a system called KarTrak using blue, white and red reflective stripes attached to the side of the cars, encoding a four-digit company identifier and a six-digit car number. Light reflected off the colored stripes was read by photomultiplier vacuum tubes.

The Boston and Maine Railroad tested the KarTrak system on their gravel cars in 1961. The tests continued until 1967, when the Association of American Railroads (AAR) selected it as a standard, Automatic Car Identification, across the entire North American fleet. The installations began on 10 October 1967. However, the economic downturn and rash of bankruptcies in the industry in the early 1970s greatly slowed the rollout, and it was not until 1974 that 95% of the fleet was labeled. To add to its woes, the system was found to be easily fooled by dirt in certain applications, which greatly affected accuracy. The AAR abandoned the system in the late 1970s, and it was not until the mid-1980s that they introduced a similar system, this time based on radio tags.

The railway project had failed, but a toll bridge in New Jersey requested a similar system so that it could quickly scan for cars that had purchased a monthly pass. Then the U.S. Post Office requested a system to track trucks entering and leaving their facilities. These applications required special retroreflector labels. Finally, Kal Kan asked the Sylvania team for a simpler (and cheaper) version which they could put on cases of pet food for inventory control.

Computer Identics Corporation
In 1967, with the railway system maturing, Collins went to management looking for funding for a project to develop a black-and-white version of the code for other industries. They declined, saying that the railway project was large enough, and they saw no need to branch out so quickly.

Collins then quit Sylvania and formed the Computer Identics Corporation. As its first innovations, Computer Identics moved from using incandescent light bulbs in its systems, replacing them with helium–neon lasers, and incorporated a mirror as well, making it capable of locating a barcode up to a meter (3 feet) in front of the scanner. This made the entire process much simpler and more reliable, and typically enabled these devices to deal with damaged labels, as well, by recognizing and reading the intact portions.

Computer Identics Corporation installed one of its first two scanning systems in the spring of 1969 at a General Motors (Buick) factory in Flint, Michigan. The system was used to identify a dozen types of transmissions moving on an overhead conveyor from production to shipping. The other scanning system was installed at General Trading Company's distribution center in Carlstadt, New Jersey to direct shipments to the proper loading bay.

Universal Product Code

In 1966, the National Association of Food Chains (NAFC) held a meeting on the idea of automated checkout systems. RCA, who had purchased the rights to the original Woodland patent, attended the meeting and initiated an internal project to develop a system based on the bullseye code. The Kroger grocery chain volunteered to test it.

In the mid-1970s, the NAFC established the Ad-Hoc Committee for U.S. Supermarkets on a Uniform Grocery-Product Code to set guidelines for barcode development. In addition, it created a symbol-selection subcommittee to help standardize the approach. In cooperation with consulting firm, McKinsey & Co., they developed a standardized 11-digit code for identifying products. The committee then sent out a contract tender to develop a barcode system to print and read the code. The request went to Singer, National Cash Register (NCR), Litton Industries, RCA, Pitney-Bowes, IBM and many others. A wide variety of barcode approaches was studied, including linear codes, RCA's bullseye concentric circle code, starburst patterns and others.

In the spring of 1971, RCA demonstrated their bullseye code at another industry meeting. IBM executives at the meeting noticed the crowds at the RCA booth and immediately developed their own system. IBM marketing specialist Alec Jablonover remembered that the company still employed Woodland, and he established a new facility in Raleigh-Durham Research Triangle Park to lead development.

In July 1972, RCA began an 18-month test in a Kroger store in Cincinnati. Barcodes were printed on small pieces of adhesive paper, and attached by hand by store employees when they were adding price tags. The code proved to have a serious problem; the printers would sometimes smear ink, rendering the code unreadable in most orientations. However, a linear code, like the one being developed by Woodland at IBM, was printed in the direction of the stripes, so extra ink would simply make the code "taller" while remaining readable. So on 3 April 1973, the IBM UPC was selected as the NAFC standard. IBM had designed five versions of UPC symbology for future industry requirements: UPC A, B, C, D, and E.

NCR installed a testbed system at Marsh's Supermarket in Troy, Ohio, near the factory that was producing the equipment. On 26 June 1974, Clyde Dawson pulled a 10-pack of Wrigley's Juicy Fruit gum out of his basket and it was scanned by Sharon Buchanan at 8:01 am. The pack of gum and the receipt are now on display in the Smithsonian Institution. It was the first commercial appearance of the UPC.

In 1971, an IBM team was assembled for an intensive planning session, threshing out, 12 to 18 hours a day, how the technology would be deployed and operate cohesively across the system, and scheduling a roll-out plan. By 1973, the team were meeting with grocery manufacturers to introduce the symbol that would need to be printed on the packaging or labels of all of their products. There were no cost savings for a grocery to use it, unless at least 70% of the grocery's products had the barcode printed on the product by the manufacturer. IBM projected that 75% would be needed in 1975. Yet, although this was achieved, there were still scanning machines in fewer than 200 grocery stores by 1977.

Economic studies conducted for the grocery industry committee projected over $40 million in savings to the industry from scanning by the mid-1970s. Those numbers were not achieved in that time-frame and some predicted the demise of barcode scanning. The usefulness of the barcode required the adoption of expensive scanners by a critical mass of retailers while manufacturers simultaneously adopted barcode labels. Neither wanted to move first and results were not promising for the first couple of years, with Business Week proclaiming "The Supermarket Scanner That Failed" in a 1976 article.

On the other hand, experience with barcode scanning in those stores revealed additional benefits. The detailed sales information acquired by the new systems allowed greater responsiveness to customer habits, needs and preferences. This was reflected in the fact that about 5 weeks after installing barcode scanners, sales in grocery stores typically started climbing and eventually leveled off at a 10–12% increase in sales that never dropped off. There was also a 1–2% decrease in operating cost for those stores, and this enabled them to lower prices and thereby to increase market share. It was shown in the field that the return on investment for a barcode scanner was 41.5%. By 1980, 8,000 stores per year were converting.

Sims Supermarkets were the first location in Australia to use barcodes, starting in 1979.

Industrial adoption
In 1981, the United States Department of Defense adopted the use of Code 39 for marking all products sold to the United States military. This system, Logistics Applications of Automated Marking and Reading Symbols (LOGMARS), is still used by DoD and is widely viewed as the catalyst for widespread adoption of barcoding in industrial uses.

Use

Barcodes are widely used around the world in many contexts. In stores, UPC barcodes are pre-printed on most items other than fresh produce from a grocery store. This speeds up processing at check-outs and helps track items and also reduces instances of shoplifting involving price tag swapping, although shoplifters can now print their own barcodes. Barcodes that encode a book's ISBN are also widely pre-printed on books, journals and other printed materials. In addition, retail chain membership cards use barcodes to identify customers, allowing for customized marketing and greater understanding of individual consumer shopping patterns. At the point of sale, shoppers can get product discounts or special marketing offers through the address or e-mail address provided at registration.

Barcodes are widely used in the healthcare and hospital settings, ranging from patient identification (to access patient data, including medical history, drug allergies, etc.) to creating SOAP Notes with barcodes to medication management. They are also used to facilitate the separation and indexing of documents that have been imaged in batch scanning applications, track the organization of species in biology, and integrate with in-motion checkweighers to identify the item being weighed in a conveyor line for data collection.

They can also be used to keep track of objects and people; they are used to keep track of rental cars, airline luggage, nuclear waste, registered mail, express mail and parcels. Barcoded tickets (which may be printed by the customer on their home printer, or stored on their mobile device) allow the holder to enter sports arenas, cinemas, theatres, fairgrounds, and transportation, and are used to record the arrival and departure of vehicles from rental facilities etc. This can allow proprietors to identify duplicate or fraudulent tickets more easily. Barcodes are widely used in shop floor control applications software where employees can scan work orders and track the time spent on a job.

Barcodes are also used in some kinds of non-contact 1D and 2D position sensors. A series of barcodes are used in some kinds of absolute 1D linear encoder. The barcodes are packed close enough together that the reader always has one or two barcodes in its field of view. As a kind of fiducial marker, the relative position of the barcode in the field of view of the reader gives incremental precise positioning, in some cases with sub-pixel resolution. The data decoded from the barcode gives the absolute coarse position. An "address carpet", such as Howell's binary pattern and the Anoto dot pattern, is a 2D barcode designed so that a reader, even though only a tiny portion of the complete carpet is in the field of view of the reader, can find its absolute X,Y position and rotation in the carpet.

2D barcodes can embed a hyperlink to a web page. A mobile device with an inbuilt camera might be used to read the pattern and browse the linked website, which can help a shopper find the best price for an item in the vicinity. Since 2005, airlines use an IATA-standard 2D barcode on boarding passes (Bar Coded Boarding Pass (BCBP)), and since 2008 2D barcodes sent to mobile phones enable electronic boarding passes.

Some applications for barcodes have fallen out of use. In the 1970s and 1980s, software source code was occasionally encoded in a barcode and printed on paper (Cauzin Softstrip and Paperbyte are barcode symbologies specifically designed for this application), and the 1991 Barcode Battler computer game system used any standard barcode to generate combat statistics.

Artists have used barcodes in art, such as Scott Blake's Barcode Jesus, as part of the post-modernism movement.

Symbologies
The mapping between messages and barcodes is called a symbology. The specification of a symbology includes the encoding of the message into bars and spaces, any required start and stop markers, the size of the quiet zone required to be before and after the barcode, and the computation of a checksum.

Linear symbologies can be classified mainly by two properties:
 Continuous vs. discrete
 Characters in discrete symbologies are composed of n bars and n − 1 spaces.  There is an additional space between characters, but it does not convey information, and may have any width as long as it is not confused with the end of the code.
 Characters in continuous symbologies are composed of n bars and n spaces, and usually abut, with one character ending with a space and the next beginning with a bar, or vice versa.  A special end pattern that has bars on both ends is required to end the code.
Two-width vs. many-width
 A two-width, also called a binary bar code, contains bars and spaces of two widths, "wide" and "narrow".  The precise width of the wide bars and spaces is not critical; typically, it is permitted to be anywhere between 2 and 3 times the width of the narrow equivalents. 
 Some other symbologies use bars of two different heights (POSTNET), or the presence or absence of bars (CPC Binary Barcode).  These are normally also considered binary bar codes.
 Bars and spaces in many-width symbologies are all multiples of a basic width called the module; most such codes use four widths of 1, 2, 3 and 4 modules.

Some symbologies use interleaving. The first character is encoded using black bars of varying width. The second character is then encoded by varying the width of the white spaces between these bars. Thus, characters are encoded in pairs over the same section of the barcode. Interleaved 2 of 5 is an example of this.

Stacked symbologies repeat a given linear symbology vertically.

The most common among the many 2D symbologies are matrix codes, which feature square or dot-shaped modules arranged on a grid pattern. 2D symbologies also come in circular and other patterns and may employ steganography, hiding modules within an image (for example, DataGlyphs).

Linear symbologies are optimized for laser scanners, which sweep a light beam across the barcode in a straight line, reading a slice of the barcode light-dark patterns.  Scanning at an angle makes the modules appear wider, but does not change the width ratios. Stacked symbologies are also optimized for laser scanning, with the laser making multiple passes across the barcode.

In the 1990s development of charge-coupled device (CCD) imagers to read barcodes was pioneered by Welch Allyn. Imaging does not require moving parts, as a laser scanner does. In 2007, linear imaging had begun to supplant laser scanning as the preferred scan engine for its performance and durability.

2D symbologies cannot be read by a laser, as there is typically no sweep pattern that can encompass the entire symbol. They must be scanned by an image-based scanner employing a CCD or other digital camera sensor technology.

Barcode readers

The earliest, and still the cheapest, barcode scanners are built from a fixed light and a single photosensor that is manually moved across the barcode. Barcode scanners can be classified into three categories based on their connection to the computer. The older type is the RS-232 barcode scanner. This type requires special programming for transferring the input data to the application program. Keyboard interface scanners connect to a computer using a PS/2 or AT keyboard–compatible adaptor cable (a "keyboard wedge"). The barcode's data is sent to the computer as if it had been typed on the keyboard.

Like the keyboard interface scanner, USB scanners do not need custom code for transferring input data to the application program. On PCs running Windows the human interface device emulates the data merging action of a hardware "keyboard wedge", and the scanner automatically behaves like an additional keyboard.

Most modern smartphones are able to decode barcode using their built-in camera. Google's mobile Android operating system can use their own Google Lens application to scan QR codes, or third-party apps like Barcode Scanner to read both one-dimensional barcodes and QR codes. Nokia's Symbian operating system featured a barcode scanner, while mbarcode is a QR code reader for the Maemo operating system. In Apple iOS 11, the native camera app can decode QR codes and can link to URLs, join wireless networks, or perform other operations depending on the QR Code contents. Other paid and free apps are available with scanning capabilities for other symbologies or for earlier iOS versions. With BlackBerry devices, the App World application can natively scan barcodes and load any recognized Web URLs on the device's Web browser. Windows Phone 7.5 is able to scan barcodes through the Bing search app. However, these devices are not designed specifically for the capturing of barcodes. As a result, they do not decode nearly as quickly or accurately as a dedicated barcode scanner or portable data terminal.

Quality control and verification
It is common for producers and users of bar codes to have a quality management system which  includes verification and validation of bar codes.   Barcode verification examines scanability and the quality of the barcode in comparison to industry standards and specifications. Barcode verifiers are primarily used by businesses that print and use barcodes. Any trading partner in the supply chain can test barcode quality. It is important to verify a barcode to ensure that any reader in the supply chain can successfully interpret a barcode with a low error rate. Retailers levy large penalties for non-compliant barcodes. These chargebacks can reduce a manufacturer's revenue by 2% to 10%.

A barcode verifier works the way a reader does, but instead of simply decoding a barcode, a verifier performs a series of tests. For linear barcodes these tests are:
 Edge contrast (EC)
The difference between the space reflectance (Rs) and adjoining bar reflectance (Rb).  EC=Rs-Rb
 Minimum bar reflectance (Rb)
The smallest reflectance value in a bar.
 Minimum space reflectance (Rs)
The smallest reflectance value in a space.
Symbol contrast (SC)
Symbol Contrast is the difference in reflectance values of the lightest space (including the quiet zone) and the darkest bar of the symbol. The greater the difference, the higher the grade. The parameter is graded as either A, B, C, D, or F.  SC=Rmax-Rmin
 Minimum edge contrast (ECmin)
The difference between the space reflectance (Rs) and adjoining bar reflectance (Rb).  EC=Rs-Rb
 Modulation (MOD)
The parameter is graded either A, B, C, D, or F. This grade is based on the relationship between minimum edge contrast (ECmin) and symbol contrast (SC).  MOD=ECmin/SC  The greater the difference between minimum edge contrast and symbol contrast, the lower the grade.  Scanners and verifiers perceive the narrower bars and spaces to have less intensity than wider bars and spaces; the comparison of the lesser intensity of narrow elements to the wide elements is called modulation. This condition is affected by aperture size.
Inter-character gap
In discrete barcodes, the space that disconnects the two contiguous characters. When present, inter-character gaps are considered spaces (elements) for purposes of edge determination and reflectance parameter grades.
 Defects
 Decode
Extracting the information which has been encoded in a bar code symbol.
 Decodability
Can be graded as A, B, C, D, or F. The Decodability grade indicates the amount of error in the width of the most deviant element in the symbol. The less deviation in the symbology, the higher the grade. Decodability is a measure of print accuracy using the symbology reference decode algorithm.

2D matrix symbols look at the parameters:
 Symbol contrast
 Modulation
 Decode
 Unused error correction
 Fixed (finder) pattern damage
 Grid non-uniformity
 Axial non-uniformity

Depending on the parameter, each ANSI test is graded from 0.0 to 4.0 (F to A), or given a pass or fail mark. Each grade is determined by analyzing the scan reflectance profile (SRP), an analog graph of a single scan line across the entire symbol. The lowest of the 8 grades is the scan grade, and the overall ISO symbol grade is the average of the individual scan grades. For most applications a 2.5 (C) is the minimal acceptable symbol grade.

Compared with a reader, a verifier measures a barcode's optical characteristics to international and industry standards. The measurement must be repeatable and consistent. Doing so requires constant conditions such as distance, illumination angle, sensor angle and verifier aperture. Based on the verification results, the production process can be adjusted to print higher quality barcodes that will scan down the supply chain.

Bar code validation may include evaluations after use (and abuse) testing such as sunlight, abrasion, impact, moisture, etc.

Barcode verifier standards
Barcode verifier standards are defined by the International Organization for Standardization (ISO), in ISO/IEC 15426-1 (linear) or ISO/IEC 15426-2 (2D). The current international barcode quality specification is ISO/IEC 15416 (linear) and ISO/IEC 15415 (2D). The European Standard EN 1635 has been withdrawn and replaced by ISO/IEC 15416. The original U.S. barcode quality specification was ANSI X3.182. (UPCs used in the US – ANSI/UCC5). As of 2011 the ISO workgroup JTC1 SC31 was developing a Direct Part Marking (DPM) quality standard: ISO/IEC TR 29158.

Benefits
In point-of-sale management, barcode systems can provide detailed up-to-date information on the business, accelerating decisions and with more confidence. For example:
 Fast-selling items can be identified quickly and automatically reordered.
 Slow-selling items can be identified, preventing inventory build-up.
 The effects of merchandising changes can be monitored, allowing fast-moving, more profitable items to occupy the best space.
 Historical data can be used to predict seasonal fluctuations very accurately.
 Items may be repriced on the shelf to reflect both sale prices and price increases.
 This technology also enables the profiling of individual consumers, typically through a voluntary registration of discount cards. While pitched as a benefit to the consumer, this practice is considered to be potentially dangerous by privacy advocates.

Besides sales and inventory tracking, barcodes are very useful in logistics and supply chain management.
 When a manufacturer packs a box for shipment, a Unique Identifying Number (UID) can be assigned to the box.
 A database can link the UID to relevant information about the box; such as order number, items packed, quantity packed, destination, etc.
 The information can be transmitted through a communication system such as Electronic Data Interchange (EDI) so the retailer has the information about a shipment before it arrives.
 Shipments that are sent to a Distribution Center (DC) are tracked before forwarding. When the shipment reaches its final destination, the UID gets scanned, so the store knows the shipment's source, contents, and cost.

Barcode scanners are relatively low cost and extremely accurate compared to key-entry, with only about 1 substitution error in 15,000 to 36 trillion characters entered. The exact error rate depends on the type of barcode.

Types of barcodes

Linear barcodes
A first generation, "one dimensional" barcode that is made up of lines and spaces of various widths or sizes that create specific patterns.

Matrix (2D) barcodes
A matrix code, also termed a 2D barcode (although not using bars as such) or simply a 2D code, is a two-dimensional way to represent information. It is similar to a linear (1-dimensional) barcode, but can represent more data per unit area.

Example images

In popular culture
In architecture, a building in Lingang New City by German architects Gerkan, Marg and Partners incorporates a barcode design, as does a shopping mall called Shtrikh-kod (Russian for barcode) in Narodnaya ulitsa ("People's Street") in the Nevskiy district of St. Petersburg, Russia.

In media, in 2011, the National Film Board of Canada and ARTE France launched a web documentary entitled Barcode.tv, which allows users to view films about everyday objects by scanning the product's barcode with their iPhone camera.

In professional wrestling, the WWE stable D-Generation X incorporated a barcode into their entrance video, as well as on a T-shirt.

In the TV series Dark Angel, the protagonist and the other transgenics in the Manticore X-series have barcodes on the back of their necks.

In video games, the protagonist of the Hitman video game series has a barcode tattoo on the back of his head; QR codes can also be scanned in a side mission in Watch Dogs.
The 2018 videogame Judgment features QR Codes that protagonist Takayuki Yagami can photograph with his phone camera. These are mostly to unlock parts for Yagami's Drone.

In the films Back to the Future Part II and The Handmaid's Tale, cars in the future are depicted with barcode licence plates.

In the Terminator films, Skynet burns barcodes onto the inside surface of the wrists of captive humans (in a similar location to the WW2 concentration camp tattoos) as a unique identifier.

In music, Dave Davies of The Kinks released a solo album in 1980, AFL1-3603, which featured a giant barcode on the front cover in place of the musician's head. The album's name was also the barcode number.

The April 1978 issue of Mad Magazine featured a giant barcode on the cover, with the blurb "[Mad] Hopes this issue jams up every computer in the country...for forcing us to deface our covers with this yecchy UPC symbol from now on!"

Interactive Textbooks were first published by Harcourt College Publishers to Expand Education Technology with Interactive Textbooks.

Designed barcodes 
Some brands integrate custom designs into barcodes (while keeping them readable) on their consumer products.

Hoaxes about barcodes 

There was minor skepticism from conspiracy theorists, who considered barcodes to be an intrusive surveillance technology, and from some Christians, pioneered by a 1982 book The New Money System 666 by Mary Stewart Relfe, who thought the codes hid the number 666, representing the "Number of the Beast". Old Believers, a separation of the Russian Orthodox Church, believe barcodes are the stamp of the Antichrist. Television host Phil Donahue described barcodes as a "corporate plot against consumers".

See also

 Automated identification and data capture (AIDC)
 Barcode printer
 Campus card
 European Article Numbering-Uniform Code Council
 Global Trade Item Number
 Identifier
 Inventory control system
 Object hyperlinking
 Semacode
 SMS barcode
 SPARQCode (QR code)
 List of GS1 country codes

References

Further reading

 Automating Management Information Systems: Barcode Engineering and Implementation – Harry E. Burke, Thomson Learning, 
 Automating Management Information Systems: Principles of Barcode Applications – Harry E. Burke, Thomson Learning, 
 The Bar Code Book – Roger C. Palmer, Helmers Publishing, 386 pages
 The Bar Code Manual – Eugene F. Brighan, Thompson Learning, 
 Handbook of Bar Coding Systems – Harry E. Burke, Van Nostrand Reinhold Company, 219 pages
 Information Technology for Retail:Automatic Identification & Data Capture Systems – Girdhar Joshi, Oxford University Press, 416 pages
 Lines of Communication – Craig K. Harmon, Helmers Publishing, 425 pages
 Punched Cards to Bar Codes – Benjamin Nelson, Helmers Publishing, 434 pages
 Revolution at the Checkout Counter: The Explosion of the Bar Code – Stephen A. Brown, Harvard University Press, 
 Reading Between The Lines – Craig K. Harmon and Russ Adams, Helmers Publishing, 297 pages
 The Black and White Solution: Bar Code and the IBM PC – Russ Adams and Joyce Lane, Helmers Publishing, 169 pages
 Sourcebook of Automatic Identification and Data Collection – Russ Adams, Van Nostrand Reinhold, 298 pages
 Inside Out: The Wonders of Modern Technology – Carol J. Amato, Smithmark Pub, 1993

External links

 

 
Encodings
Automatic identification and data capture
1952 introductions
American inventions
Records management technology